Trapezites iacchus, the Iacchus skipper, is a butterfly of the family Hesperiidae. It is found in the Australian states of New South Wales and Queensland.

The wingspan is about 30 mm.

The larvae feed on Lomandra hystrix, Lomandra longifolia and Lomandra multiflora.

External links
 Australian Caterpillars

Trapezitinae
Butterflies described in 1775
Taxa named by Johan Christian Fabricius